Gokulpur  is a village in Chanditala II community development block of Srirampore subdivision in Hooghly district in the Indian state of West Bengal.

Geography
Chanditala police station serves this Village.

Gram panchayat
Villages and census towns in Barijhati gram panchayat are: Barijhati, Beledanga, Gokulpur, Khanpur, Makhalpara and Thero.

Demographics
As per 2011 Census of India, Gokulpur had a total population of 560 of which 288 (51%) were males and 272 (49%) were females. Population below 6 years was 76. The total number of literates in Gokulpur was 374 (77.27% of the population over 6 years).

References 

Villages in Chanditala II CD Block